The First Presbyterian Church is a historic church at the junction of Vandervoort and N. Fifth Sts., SW corner in De Queen, Arkansas.  It is a single-story wood-frame structure, built in 1898 for a newly established congregation.  The church is the city's finest example of Gothic Revival architecture, with Gothic-arched entrances on the north and east faces of the tower, and a large three-part Gothic window on the eastern gable end, topped with triangular arches.  The main gable ends of the roof are decorated with brackets, as are the ends of a cross gable on the southern elevation.

The church was listed on the National Register of Historic Places in 1994.

See also
National Register of Historic Places listings in Sevier County, Arkansas

References

Presbyterian churches in Arkansas
Churches on the National Register of Historic Places in Arkansas
Carpenter Gothic church buildings in Arkansas
Churches completed in 1898
Churches in Sevier County, Arkansas
1898 establishments in Arkansas
National Register of Historic Places in Sevier County, Arkansas